Thomas Evans Dimmick  (born May 1, 1931) was an American and Canadian football player who played for the Hamilton Tiger-Cats, Philadelphia Eagles and Dallas Texans. He won the Grey Cup with Hamilton in 1957. He played college football University of Houston and was drafted in the 1956 NFL draft by the Eagles (Round 10, #113 overall). He started off his career with them in 1956 before going to Hamilton to play for the 1957 season. He then played for Dallas in the American Football League in 1960.

References

1931 births
Hamilton Tiger-Cats players
Living people
Philadelphia Eagles players
University of Houston alumni